Zavaritski Caldera (Vulkan Zavaritskogo) is a caldera located in the central part of Simushir Island, Kuril Islands, Russia. Lake Biryuzovoe partially fills the youngest of three nested calderas on the volcano.

The volcano is named after Alexander Nikolayevich Zavaritski, scientist of the Academy of Sciences of the Soviet Union.

See also
 List of volcanoes in Russia

References 
 
 Aerial image retrieve from NASA Technical Reports Server on 19 April 2007.

Simushir
Active volcanoes
Volcanic crater lakes
Calderas of Russia
Volcanoes of the Kuril Islands
Pleistocene calderas
Holocene calderas